Inocenc Arnošt Bláha (1879–1960) was a prominent Czech sociologist and philosopher. Since 1922 the professor of sociology at the Masaryk university, Brno, 1950 pensioned. Bláha was the leading figure of the Brno school of sociology and author of the theoretical concept of 'federative functionalism'.

Bibliography
Město: sociologická studie ("City: a sociological study"), Praha 1914.
Filosofie mravnosti ("Philosophy of morals"), Brno: A.Píša 1922.
Sociologie sedláka a dělníka ("Sociology of farmer and worker"), Praha: Orbis 1925, 2nd ed. 1937.
Sociologie dětství ("A sociology of childhood"), 1927, (reed. 1930, 1946 revised, 1948).
Sociologie intelligence ("Sociology of the Intelligentsia"), Praha: Orbis 1937.
Sociologie ("Sociology"), ed. Juliána Obrdlíková, Praha: Academia 1968.
Československá sociologie: od svého vzniku do roku 1948 ("The Czechoslovak sociology from its origins until 1948"), ed. V. Kadlec, Brno: Doplněk 1997.

References
Biography 

Czech philosophers
1879 births
1960 deaths
Academic staff of Masaryk University
Czech sociologists